The 12415 / 12416 Indore – New Delhi Intercity Express is a daily superfast train service which runs between Indore, the largest city and commercial hub of Central Indian state Madhya Pradesh and New Delhi, the capital city of India.

This train is the only lengthy train from Indore, having a total of 22 Coaches and is the most preferable choice of the Indore people to reach Delhi. This train is the only ISO Certified train of Indore.

Coach Composition

The train consists of 22 coaches :

 1 AC First Class
 1 AC II Tier
 3 AC III Tier
 12 Sleepar Class
 3 General Unreserved
 2 End On Generator

Service

The 12415/Indore - New Delhi Intercity Express has an average speed of 61 km/hr and covers 826 km in 13 hrs 35 mins.

The 12416/New Delhi - Indore Intercity Express has an average speed of 60 km/hr and covers 826 km in 13 hrs 40 mins.

Route & Halts

The important halts of the train are :

Schedule

Direction Reversal

Train reverses its direction at:

Traction

Both trains are hauled by a Tughlakabad based WAP 7 electric locomotive from end to end.

See also

 Malwa Express

References

Transport in Indore
Transport in Delhi
Intercity Express (Indian Railways) trains
Rail transport in Uttar Pradesh
Rail transport in Madhya Pradesh
Rail transport in Haryana
Rail transport in Rajasthan
Rail transport in Delhi
Railway services introduced in 1992